Line 8 of Suzhou Rail Transit is a planned "L" shaped rapid transit line on both the east-west and north-south axes. It will serve Suzhou New District, Gusu District, Xiangcheng District, and Suzhou Industrial Park. Construction started on September 30, 2019, and is expected to end in 2024. Line 8 is expected to open in September 2024.

Stations

References 

Suzhou Rail Transit lines